Projekt Warszawa is a professional men's volleyball club based in Warsaw in central Poland. The club currently plays in the Polish PlusLiga.

Honours

International
 CEV Challenge Cup
2nd place (1): 2011–12

Team
As of 2022–23 season

Coaching staff
Players

Season by season

Former names

See also

External links
 Official website 
 Team profile at PlusLiga.pl 
 Team profile at Volleybox.net

Polish volleyball clubs
Sport in Warsaw
Volleyball clubs established in 1954
1954 establishments in Poland